Wirgin was a German company which is still known for its brands Wirgin and Edixa, and for its camera types like the Edina, the Edinex or the Gewirette. It was based in the Hessian capital Wiesbaden and made a line of quite inexpensive 35mm SLRs from the 1950s to the 1970s, including the Edixa Reflex and Edixa-Mat Reflex. Wirgin was West Germany's main producer of SLRs with focal plane shutter. It also produced some of the lenses for its cameras, among them several M42 screw mount lenses.

Wirgin was founded by the brothers Heinrich, Max and Josef Wirgin in 1920. They introduced their first distinctive camera in 1927, the Edinex, which they produced also as Adrette for Adox. In 1934 the company surprised the market with a very small viewfinder camera for type 127 film, the Gewirette. From the mid-1930s it also made Edinex 35mm viewfinder cameras. These came equipped with Wirgin Gewironar lens and Compur shutter or  Culminar lens (alike Tessar) with Prontor shutter.

In 1938 Heinrich and Josef Wirgin were still in charge of their company in Wiesbaden.  However, the Nazi persecution of the Jews compelled them to escape from Germany, with the help of one of their clerks.  Max arrived in the US May 14, 1936, Max helped his brothers follow him to America.  The Wirgin factory in Wiesbaden became incorporated into the Adox company.

After the war Heinrich Wirgin came back from America, now as Henry Wirgin, and refounded the Wirgin company in Wiesbaden. An administrative officer of the American occupied zone of Germany sent Heinz Waaske as promising aspirant to Wirgin. At that time Waaske had sold his prototype of a miniature camera to the Americans. In 1951 the talented mechanician Waaske became camera constructor. He constructed the company's first SLR, a model with focal plane shutter, the first camera like that in Western Germany. He also constructed a more elegant SLR prototype, and later a complicated electronically controlled SLR with Compur shutter, and a stereo rangefinder camera.

In 1962 Henry Wirgin bought Franka Kamerawerk. Several 35mm viewfinder cameras had been made in the Franka-Kamerawerk in Bayreuth/Oberfranken, for example the one visible in the picture at the right side of this page, an Edixa with builtin selenium meter and a lens with selectors for shutter speed, aperture and distance.

Made in Bayreuth and Wiesbaden were the small Edixa cameras for 16mm film with removable coupled or uncoupled meter, all derived from an original model designed by Heinz Waaske in Wiesbaden and developed and produced in Wiesbaden and Bayreuth as Edixa 16, Franka 16, or, for the Karstadt department stores, as alka 16.

Waaske left Wirgin since Henry Wirgin had decided to give up camera production sooner or later. Wirgin granted the rights on a new 35mm viewfinder camera to Waaske. This camera was none less than the prototype of what became the famous Rollei 35. Waaske had constructed it at Wirgin company.

In 1967 the Franka-Werk was closed. In 1968 Henry Wirgin closed his original company and continued the production of some camera models in a new smaller plant. In 1971, shortly before its closing, the company introduced a quite modern but heavy  SLR camera.

Some cameras sold by Wirgin and its American sales branch Edixa were not made by Wirgin or Franka, mainly the Edixa 8mm movie camera which was made in Japan.

Henry Wirgin died in 1989, in the age of 90 years, in Wiesbaden. He had not only been one of the top entrepreneurs of the West German camera industry, he was also engaged in rewinning normal friendly relationships of non-Jewish Germans to Jewish citizens as chairman of the Society for German-Jewish co-operation.

35mm film
 Edinex series
 several Edina
 and Edixa models

SLR

M42
 Edixa Reflex series (beginning with the Komet)
variants of the Edixa Reflex series:
 Edixa-Mat Reflex (with rapid mirror)
 Edixa Reflex, budget variants S, BV, SV, Kadett, Ba, Ca, Edixa 500
 Edixa Prismaflex LTL (fixed prism)

bayonet
 Edixa Rex b, Edixa Rex d, Edixa Rex CdS
 Edixa Rex TTL (fixed prism)
bayonet and M42:
 Edixa Prismat TTL, Edixa Prismat LTL (fixed prism)

leaf shutter
 Edixa Electronica (fixed prism)

Prontor focal plane shutter
 Edixa Electronica TL (fixed prism)

made by Cosina
 Edixa 2 MTL

16mm film
 Edixa 16 series
16mmsubminiature camera:Edixa 16、Edixa 16M、Edixa 16MB、Franka 16 

Body Alunimiu body with plastic trims。
Lenses，high end Edixa16MB，Edixa16M use Schneider Kreuznach Xena 25mm F/2.8 Tessar 4 element 3 group lens，mid range Edixa16 uses Travegar 25mm f/2.8 Tessar lens，the rest use TRINAR Cooke triplet lens。
Focusing dial：unit lens movement focusing，40mm to infinity。
Shutter：four leave in front of the lens shutter，B，1/30，1/60，1/150。

Film

Edixa16mm uses  Rollei 16 type RADA cartridge，loaded with unperforated 16mm film 。Film width 16mm，frame format 14x21mm，20 exposures per cartridge。

Accessories

chain
genuine leather case
Lens hood
color filter set
1m close up attachment lens
0.5m close up lens
0.25m close up lens
AG1 flash
Development tank
Slide projector
Selenium exposure meter, directly coupled to the shutter

127 film
 Gewirette
 Reporter
 Klein-Edinex

120 film
 some sophisticated bellows cameras and several other folding cameras like the Rofika (=Rollfilmkamera)
 Wirgin Reflex (export version of the Reflecta)
 Wirgin Reflex (export version of the Altiflex)
 Wirgin Reflex (name variant of the Hollywood Reflex)
 the simpler camera line Presto, also made as Adox Sport

External links

General links 
In English:
 History of Wirgin (German version) by Klaus-Eckhard Riess in his camera site
In German:
 Wirgin.info website by Stefan Schaum - Holzappel
In French:
 Wirgin page at Collection G. Even's site

Miscellaneous

In English:
 Edixa SLR cameras in Andrey's M42 pages
 Wirgin / Edixa section at Retrography.com by Simon Simonsen, Denmark
In German:
 Edixa Flex and Edixa-mat Kadett in Klaus-Eckhard Riess' camera site
 Edixa Stereo IA and Edixa Stereo IIIA in Welt der Stereoskopie
In French:
 Cameras and user manuals at www.collection-appareils.com

 
Photography companies of Germany
Companies acquired from Jews under Nazi rule
Manufacturing companies established in 1920
1920 establishments in Germany
Manufacturing companies disestablished in 1971
1971 disestablishments in West Germany